Bill (or William) Hook (May 28, 1925 – May 10, 2010), born in New Rochelle, New York, was a Chess master and the Captain of the British Virgin Islands chess team.
  
Starting in 1968, Hook led the Virgin Islands team, and later the British Virgin Islands team, at numerous Chess Olympiads, mostly playing top board. At the Malta Olympiad of 1980, Hook won the gold medal on board 1 for best percentage result of any national team member. He defeated a grandmaster and several national champions along the way. To commemorate this achievement the British Virgin Islands issued a stamp in his honor.

During the preliminary rounds of the 1970 Siegen Olympiad, the Virgin Islands were paired with the USA team and Hook faced the legendary Bobby Fischer. Playing the black pieces, Hook ventured a pet line of the French Defence whereupon an exciting encounter developed, culminating in a stylish rook sacrifice by Fischer.

Hook authored a book as well as various magazine and newspaper articles about chess. In the art world, he is known for his one-man shows in painting and photography. He lived in Washington DC, with his wife Mimi, until his death on May 10, 2010.

Books
Hooked on Chess by Bill Hook

References

Olimpbase - Olympiads and other Team event information

External links
 
 
 
 ]
 Bill Hook rating card at FIDE 
 Review of "Hooked on Chess"

1925 births
2010 deaths
American chess players
British Virgin Islands chess players
Sportspeople from New Rochelle, New York
American emigrants to the British Virgin Islands